Shaw Creek is a stream in the U.S. state of Ohio.

Shaw Creek was named for Jonathan Shaw, Sr., a pioneer settler who built a mill on Shaw Creek in 1814.

See also
List of rivers of Ohio

References

Rivers of Morrow County, Ohio
Rivers of Ohio